Odense Isstadion ('Odense Ice Stadium'), also known as Spar Nord Arena for sponsorship reasons, is an ice hockey arena in Bolbro, Odense, Denmark. It has previously been known as VinMedKant Arena, Bryggeriet Vestfyen Arena, and Albani Arena for sponsorship reasons. The arena is used for ice hockey as well as figure skating and serves as the home ice of the Odense Bulldogs and Odense Ishockey Klub (OIK). Odense Isstadion has a 3,280 spectator capacity, of which 1,024 are seated.

The secondary rink has a total capacity of 1,250 spectators, of which 350 are seated.

References

Indoor ice hockey venues in Denmark
Sport in Odense